Knox Farm Historic District is a historic farm complex and national historic district located near Cleveland, Rowan County, North Carolina.  The Robert Knox House was built between 1854 and 1856, and is a two-story, single-pile, three-bay vernacular Greek Revival style frame dwelling. It has a two-story rear ell, one-story rear kitchen ell.  Its builder James Graham also built the Jacob Barber House and the Hall Family House. Other contributing resources are the log corn crib, reaper shed (c. 1870-1880), power plan (c. 1945), chicken house (c. 1930), brooder house (c. 1930), log smokehouse, barn (c. 1839-1845), main barn (1916), milking parlor (1948), spring house (18th century), tenant house (1920), and Knox Chapel Methodist Church (1870s).

It was listed on the National Register of Historic Places in 1983.

References

Farms on the National Register of Historic Places in North Carolina
Historic districts on the National Register of Historic Places in North Carolina
Greek Revival houses in North Carolina
Houses completed in 1856
Buildings and structures in Rowan County, North Carolina
National Register of Historic Places in Rowan County, North Carolina